Bheerkot is a municipality in Syangja District of Gandaki Zone of central Nepal. The new municipality was formed by merging four existing villages—Banethok Deurali, Darsing Dahathum, Dhapuk Simal Bhanjyang and Khilung Deurali—on 18 September 2015. It has 9 wards. The office of the municipality is that of the former Darsing Dahathum village development committee's Bayarghari Bazaar.

Bheerkot is formed by merging four village development committee: Banethok Deurali, Darsing Dahathum, Dhapuk Simal Bhanjyang and Khilung Deurali & the total population of these four places is 18,134.

Background 
Bheerkot was named by the locals of Banethok Deurali, Darsing Dahathum, Dhapuk Simal Bhanjyang-phoxing and Khilung Deurali.It is a famous historical place.

References

External links
District Development Committee, Syangja

Populated places in Syangja District
Municipalities of Syangja District
Syangja District
Nepal municipalities established in 2015